Gilberto Antonio Hirata Chico (born 17 January 1952) is a Mexican politician who served as a federal deputy in the Chamber of Deputies representing the Third Federal Electoral District of Baja California (corresponding to the urban area of Ensenada, Baja California) and as a state deputy in the XIX Legislature of the Congress of Baja California. He  formerly served as the Presidente Municipal of the Ensenada Municipality.

See also 
 2007 Baja California state election

References 

1952 births
Living people
Institutional Revolutionary Party politicians
Mexican politicians of Japanese descent
Mexican people of Japanese descent
Politicians from Baja California
People from Ensenada Municipality
21st-century Mexican politicians
Members of the Congress of Baja California
Academic staff of the Autonomous University of Baja California
Members of the Chamber of Deputies (Mexico) for Baja California